The Nintendo e-Reader, commonly abbreviated as e-Reader, is an add-on manufactured by Nintendo for its Game Boy Advance handheld video game console. It was released in Japan in December 2001, with a North American release following in September 2002. It has an LED scanner that reads "e-Reader cards", paper cards with specially encoded data printed on them.

Depending on the card and associated game, the e-cards are typically used in a key-like function to unlock secret items, levels, or play mini-games when swiped through the reader. The cards themselves contain data, as opposed to unlocking data already on the device itself.

Usage and versions
Two versions were released in Japan: the original e-Reader (without a link cable port), which could read cards to unlock game content, etc.; and later the e-Reader+ (simply "e-Reader" in Australia and North America), which came with a link cable port to connect with Nintendo GameCube games such as Animal Crossing and with other Game Boy Advance systems for games such as Pokémon Ruby and Sapphire. The e-Reader was only considered successful in Japan. In 2004, Nintendo's head European PR confirmed that the e-Reader would not be releasing in Europe, following a year of confusion surrounding the subject. She stated "The market potential isn't great enough." It was discontinued in North America in early 2004, due to a lack of popularity. In Japan, it sold much better and was produced up to the discontinuation of the Game Boy hardware line.

In order to add items and scan levels in games such as Super Mario Advance 4: Super Mario Bros. 3, a player required two Game Boy Advance systems and a link cable. The gray end would go into the e-Reader GBA and the purple end into the GBA that had the game.  After entering the needed point on the game, players would swipe the cards in and the data would be transferred to the game cartridge. This function does not work with the Nintendo DS due to the lack of link cable support.

e-Reader cards

In the U.S., e-Reader Card packs have been released that contain:
NES games
New levels and power-ups for Super Mario Advance 4: Super Mario Bros. 3
Items and designs for Animal Crossing
New trainers to battle in Pokémon Ruby and Sapphire
Mini-games, including an exclusive version of Mario Party.
Game & Watch Cards; originally there were plans to release more Game and Watch games as a series of E-reader cards. Only Manhole-e was officially released.

There have been numerous other games released with e-Reader support in Japan.

Dot code

Data is encoded on the cards using "dot code", a specialized barcode technology licensed from Olympus Corporation. e-Reader Cards may have one or two sets of dot code on them, either a wide strip on the left side of the card, a wide strip on both the left and right sides of the card, a narrow strip on the bottom of the card or a short strip on the bottom of the card with a long strip on the left side of the card. Smaller games may require scanning only one card (two sets of dot code), while the greater NES games can require as many as five cards (nine to ten sets of dot code) in order to start the application.

The shorter sets of dot code were only used with the Pokémon Trading Card Game.  Cards released in regular sets published by both Nintendo and Wizards of the Coast had a dot code on the bottom side of the card. When scanned, the e-Reader displayed a Pokédex data entry for the Pokémon shown on the card. Many of the cards published by Wizards of the Coast included a left side dot code that would allow users to play mini-games, animations, and use secret attacks in the Trading Card Game or play with various songs and graphics.

Compatibility

The e-Reader plugs into the cartridge slot of the Game Boy Advance like a regular game would. The end of the e-Reader sticks out from the Game Boy Advance unit to provide a slot to scan the e-Reader Cards. Electronically, the e-Reader is compatible with any console that supports Game Boy Advance games, however it may be mechanically incompatible with some systems (it simply does not fit), and the ability to link consoles may not be available.

Once installed, the link cable connector on the Game Boy Advance is obstructed, but a pass-through connection on the e-Reader allows link-up features to be used. The Game Boy Advance SP is also fully compatible, although the e-Reader does not mount flush with the SP (see picture). As the link cable connector on the SP is unobstructed, the pass-through on the e-Reader is not used. An additional cover  (AGB-016) can be added to the e-reader in order to avoid damaging the 6 pin connector when linked to a GBA SP.

The Game Boy Player is also fully compatible, and the e-Reader connects as it would to a Game Boy Advance (the e-Reader pass-through connector is used for connecting the link cable). The GameCube hosting this system acts as a Game Boy Advance - in order to link to a GameCube game, a second GameCube (or a Wii) running the game in question, must be used.

The e-Reader can fit into the DS Lite, but not the original DS. The e-Reader can however be modified to fit into the original DS. In either case, there is no support for linking features, as neither system has a link cable port.

The e-Reader fits into the Game Boy Micro and has a link cable port, but not a standard connector. A special Game Boy Micro Game Link Cable must be used for linking features. The Game Boy Micro's non-standard link cable port can not accept the Nintendo GameCube Game Boy Advance Cable, meaning it cannot link with GameCube games without modification to the cable.

Because the first version of the Japanese e-Reader did not have a link cable pass-through connector, it can fit into consoles which the later e-Readers are incompatible with. Even though the Game Boy Advance and the DS are region-free, Japanese e-Reader cards work only on Japanese e-Readers and North American e-Reader cards will only work on North American e-Readers. The system will display 'region error' on both systems if a user attempts to use another region's cards on their own device.

Game list

Classic NES Series
Each game in this series comes in a pack of five cards, each of which must be scanned twice, on both sides. There are thirteen games in this series; each is a direct port of the one-player mode of the classic NES game of the same title (minus the added "-e" suffix). Excitebike, Donkey Kong, and Ice Climber, all released as e-Reader cards, were later released in cartridge form as part of the Classic NES Series on Game Boy Advance. Also, all games except Urban Champion were included as unlockables in the GameCube game Animal Crossing, in full two-player mode where applicable, and all games except Golf were included in Wii's Virtual Console.

All NES titles released include:

Animal Crossing-e
A series of Animal Crossing cards were released for the e-Reader. When used with the post office in the game, the cards could provide items to players, unlock "town tunes", or unlock new designs to be used around the village. Some were "sibling" cards (series 2–4) with two related characters on the front. In addition to being sold in card packs, some regular series cards were distributed on a promotional basis through GameStop, EB Games, and Energizer batteries.

Pokémon Battle-e
The Pokémon Battle-e Cards, when scanned into Pokémon Ruby or Sapphire, allowed the player to load up special trainers to battle or to get special berries. In Japan, the series was sold as six sets, each with a different theme, with 10 cards in each set (8 trainers, 1 berry, and 1 checklist), while in the US, the series was packaged together to have two themes per pack. In addition, 2 promo cards, 1 for each version, were packed in with the games. The cards are loaded into Ruby or Sapphire through the Mystery Events function once it is unlocked.

Trainer Cards – When scanned and loaded into Ruby and Sapphire, a trainer would appear in a house in Mossdeep City. When the player battled the trainer, the Pokémon used in battle would not gain Exp. points, and the trainer would not earn any winnings, like in a Battle Tower or link battle. The checklist card in each set lists all the trainers for the theme of the set.

Enigma Berries – When scanned and loaded into Ruby and Sapphire, a Special Berry would be set into the game. The first time an Enigma Berry card is scanned, the player gets the berry from Norman. When a new Enigma Berry card is scanned, all the Enigma Berries in the game change into the newly scanned one. An Enigma berry cannot leave the game it was scanned into, except through Diamond and Pearl's migration system. When the berry is transferred, it changes into "Enigma Berry", no matter what Enigma Berry it was before, and gains the ability to restore the HP of a Pokémon holding it if it was hit by a super effective attack.

Eon Ticket – This card is seen as part of this set as it is scanned through the same method. See "Other" below for more info.

Battle-e Cards – There were additional Battle-e card sets for Pokémon FireRed, LeafGreen and Emerald in Japan, however due to the e-Reader being discontinued in the US they were never released in other regions. The e-Reader functionality was eventually removed from all non-Japanese versions of the games.

Pokémon Colosseum
In Pokémon Colosseum, there is a Colosseum at the back of Phenac City. There are 2 large doors, which in the English version lead to the same arena. In the Japanese version the right door goes to the arena, while the left door leads to a special e-Reader area where players can scan in extra cards to battle additional trainers and capture three more Shadow Pokémon.

Pokémon Pinball: Ruby & Sapphire

There were five cards that were released that were compatible with the Japanese version. These cards do not add any new features to the game, rather they merely tweak the difficulty levels or increase odds of certain events happening.

Super Mario Advance 4: Super Mario Bros. 3-e

There are 36 cards, divided into two series: 18 for Series 1 and 18 for Series 2. In each package of 18 cards there are five demo cards, five level cards, eight power-up cards, and a promotional card without data strips which only contains an advertisement for the Pokémon Battle-e cards. More were released in Japan; however,  they never saw American release due to the discontinuation of the device.

Two promotional cards came packed in with every US and Australian copy of the game sold. Five additional cards were released for a very short time and were packed in with the game and sold exclusively at Walmart stores in the US. These five cards have become extremely hard to find, as the e-Reader had been discontinued in North America not long after the release of the game. The two e-Reader cards that were initially bundled with Super Mario Advance 4 have since been discontinued.

The Virtual Console rerelease of the game for Wii U and the Nintendo Switch Online release include all of the e-Reader levels, including those that were never released outside of Japan.

Mega Man Battle Network and Mega Man Zero 3 cards
The Japanese Mega Man games for GBA used Card Reader e+ cards to customize their game with the e-Reader +. The cards caused various effects as, such as Base HP, Abilities, Buster Changes, Charge Shot Modifications, B+ Back Abilities. There are even Item Cards which can give out sets of Battle Chips, Sub Chips, BugFrags, Zenny, and even Navi Customizer Programs (Only introduced in Mega Man Battle Network 6 Modification Card Part 1 & Battle Network 6 Modification Card Part 2). They could also cause negative effects ('Bugs') to happen, causing such effects as causing Mega Man to lose health and move the wrong way, or causing the player to be unable to control it. As for the Mega Man Zero 3 Cards, they change the Resistance Base and add an overhaul of new things to it as well as Weapon Upgrades and Bullet Appearances to make an actual Buster Shot look like a real bullet that an actual gun fires.

The only way to gain the cards' effects in the English versions is through various cheating devices, such as Code Breaker, Action Replay and GameShark (although in Battle Network 6 all e-Reader content was removed from the European and American versions, and can no longer be accessed). The Mega Man Zero Collection and Mega Man Zero/ZX Legacy Collection, and Mega Man Battle Network Legacy Collection releases includes the e-Reader bonuses for Mega Man Zero 3 and Battle Network 4 - 6 as unlockables, marking the first time they have been legitimately accessible outside of Japan.

F-Zero: GP Legend

Exclusive to the Japanese version, e+ cards could be used to unlock additional machines, race courses, and staff ghosts to race in the game's time trial mode.

OtherE3 2002 Promo Pack: A very rare promotional pack given away at the 2002 E3 conference, this pack contained a variant Manhole e-card, two Pokémon trading card game cards and a Kirby card that, when scanned, would tell the player if they have won a prize. The Kirby card is considered to be the rarest e-Reader card produced.Mario Party-e: A complete card game with 64 cards using the e-Reader for minigames.
Mario Party-e Promo Card:  While not an e-Reader Card (the card contains no dot codes), a promotional "Two Coin Card" was packed with GamePro magazine and can be fully used with the Mario Party-e game.Air Hockey-e: A promotional card given away at various retailers when the e-Reader was initially released. This card  plays a real game of fast-paced air hockey.  An AU-exclusive version of this card was packed in with the e-Reader when sold in Australia.
Manhole-e: A port of the original Game & Watch game. Included with the e-Reader, the player must close the manholes as pedestrians pass by. A complete Game & Watch card series was planned for release, but never made it to stores.
FoxBox Kirby Slide Puzzle: A slide puzzle game included in issue 175 of Nintendo Power and in an issue of Tips & Tricks Magazine. It was also given away with FoxBox promotional boxes at Toys R Us.
EON Ticket: A promotional card given away at E3, at Toys R Us during the EON Ticket Summer Tour in 2003 and in issue 173 of Nintendo Power. This card was used to get Latias or Latios on Pokémon Ruby or Pokémon Sapphire by allowing the player access to the Southern Island location. Latias was given in the former and Latios was given in the latter. 
Pokémon Channel: Three US exclusive cards and three Australian variant cards were released with the Nintendo GameCube Game Pokémon Channel. The USA version holds a "6-Pattern" card, a Pikachu card and a Kyogre card, whereas the Australian version has a Jirachi card, instead of the Kyogre card.
Domo-Kun no Fushigi Terebi: Released in packs exclusively throughout Japan, little is known about this series to English-speakers. The cards extended the original title by a great number of mini-games and events not available on the cartridge.
Mario vs. Donkey Kong: CoroCoro Comic had a competition where 1,000 people won a set of five cards, and a sixth was distributed at the 2004 Next-Generation World Hobby Fair. Despite there being data for twelve levels within the game, only these six cards were released. They are considered to be among the rarest of e-Cards. While connecting the North American version of the game to a Japanese e-Reader+ and fully scanning one of the cards will reveal the e-Reader menu, the cards cannot be used to unlock any levels. However, all versions of the GBA game have the data for these 12 levels, unlockable via Action Replay codes.
Pikmin 2-e: Exclusive to Japan, six packs of e-Reader minigames were released subsequent to the release of Pikmin 2. These games challenge players to pluck all the Pikmin in an area in a set amount of steps, to try to get Pikmin from one point to another without injury, etc. The cards contain region-specific encoding blocking their use with North American systems.

Notes

References

External links
Official page at Nintendo of Japan's website 

Game Boy accessories
Video games using barcodes
Video game console add-ons